Entomacrodus cadenati is a species of fish in the family Blenniidae.

It is found in the waters of West-African countries such as Guinea, Senegal, Cape Verde, Equatorial Guinea and São Tomé and Príncipe. The adults occur on rocky coastlines. It is an oviparous species which lays demersal eggs which adhere to the substrate by an adhesive filamentouspad or pedestal. The specific name honours the French ichthyologist Jean Cadenat (1908-1992) who was the Director of the Marine Biological Section of the Institute Français d’Afrique Noire in Gorée, Senegal, the collector of the type specimens and who sent them to Springer to assist him in his study of the marine fish of Africa.

References

cadenati
Marine fish of Africa
Taxa named by Victor G. Springer
Fish described in 1967
Taxonomy articles created by Polbot